Marko Đuričin (1925–2013) was a Serbian communist politician and political activist of SFR Yugoslavia. He served as Chairman of the Vojvodina Council of Trade Unions from 1974 to 1978, and as a member of the Presidium of the League of Communists of Vojvodina from 1978. From 1982 to 1983 he served as President of the League of Communists of Vojvodina, succeeding Slavko Veselinov. He died in 2013.

References
 http://rulers.org/ruls2.html#serbia
 Stroynowski, Juliusz. Who's Who in the Socialist Countries of Europe. a Biographical Encyclopedia of More than 12.600 Leading Personalities in Albania, Bulgaria, Czechoslovakia, German Democratic Republic, Hungary, Poland, Romania, Yugoslavia: A-H ; Index. Vol. 1, K.G. Saur Publications, 1989.

1925 births
2013 deaths
People from Novi Bečej
Yugoslav communists